This list of largest pension funds in the United States involves two main groups: government pension funds for public employees and collectively bargained pension funds, jointly managed between employer and employee representatives after the Taft-Hartley Act of 1947. In practice, Taft-Hartley plans have many units of local pension funds, under an umbrella group.

Largest U.S. public pension funds 
The rankings below are the 30 largest public pension plans in the U.S., according to the 2018 list compiled by Pensions & Investments magazine.

See also
Pension fund
US labor law
Individual Retirement Account
Congressional pension

References

External links
 OECD Annual Survey of Large Pension Funds and Public Pension Reserve Funds  2015
 U.S. Census 2016 Survey of Public Pensions: State & Local Data

Retirement plans in the United States
Public pension funds